Asadullah Jan is a citizen of Pakistan who was held in extrajudicial detention in the United States's Guantanamo Bay detention camps, in Cuba.
His Guantanamo Internment Serial Number was 47.
Joint Task Force -- Guantanamo analysts estimate he was born in 1981. However, he says he was only sixteen when he was captured in 2001.

Joint Task Force Guantanamo analysts assert he is a citizen of Pakistan.  He said he was a child of Afghan refugees, who was born in Pakistan.

Joint Task Force Guantanamo analysts assert his name was "Asad Ullah". However, in interviews with reporters with the McClatchy News Service in 2008, he said his name was "Asadullah Jan".

He was repatriated July 16, 2003.

McClatchy News Service interview

On June 15, 2008, the McClatchy News Service published a series of articles based on interviews with 66 former Guantanamo captives.
Asadullah Jan
was one of three former captives who had an article profiling him.

Asadullah Jan explained that he was returning from a visit to relatives in Zormat when he was stopped at a checkpoint in Kohat, Pakistan and apprehended around the time of Ramadan in 2001.  
He was held in Pakistan, for approximately a month before his first interrogation by Americans.

His first interview was by a woman and two men, in civilian clothes, at the Pakistani jail.    
His interpreter said they were with the CIA, although they didn't identify themselves.  He told his McClatchy interviewer their questions surprised him—apparently Pakistani security officials had told them he was a son of Osama bin Laden.  The CIA officials had him transferred to US custody in the Kandahar detention facility.  Guards beat him brutally upon his arrival, and routinely beat him and other captives, while he was detained there.  His interrogators however never beat him.  He described the conditions in the camp as primitive: 

Asadullah Jan told his interviewer he personally saw a guard drop a Koran into a latrine.

Asadullah Jan told his interviewer he was plagued by memories of Guantanamo, that mention of the USA would bring back troubling recollections.

See also
Minors detained in the War on Terror

References

External links
 The Guantánamo Files: Website Extras (3) – “Osama’s Bodyguards” Andy Worthington
 McClatchy News Service - video

Guantanamo detainees known to have been released
Living people
1985 births